Noel Michael LaMontagne (born March 9, 1977) is a former American football offensive guard. He played college football at Virginia. He signed with the Cleveland Browns as an undrafted free agent following the 2000 NFL Draft and played for the Browns in 2000.

Early life and education
LaMontagne was born in Bethlehem, Pennsylvania and grew up in nearby Coopersburg. He attended and graduated from Southern Lehigh High School in Center Valley in 1995. 

He attended the University of Virginia, where he redshirted one season and then played left guard for the Virginia Cavaliers from 1996 to 1999. He was a three-time first-team All-Atlantic Coast Conference honoree in 1997, 1998, and 1999.

NFL career
LaMontagne appeared in two games for the Cleveland Browns in 2000. Due to knee surgery, he was placed on injured reserve for much of that season. After twisting his knee during a minicamp in March 2001, LaMontagne had two more surgeries. The Browns released LaMontagne on July 20, 2001, days before training camp was to begin.

In the fall of 2001, LaMontagne returned to Southern Lehigh High School, where he volunteered as an assistant coach. He retired from football and became a sports agent.

References

External links
NFL.com profile

Living people
1977 births
Southern Lehigh High School alumni
Players of American football from Pennsylvania
American football offensive linemen
Virginia Cavaliers football players
Cleveland Browns players
Sportspeople from Bethlehem, Pennsylvania
People from Coopersburg, Pennsylvania
High school football coaches in Pennsylvania
Sportspeople from Lehigh County, Pennsylvania